The third season of the television comedy series Community premiered on September 22, 2011 and concluded on May 17, 2012 on NBC. The season consists of 22 episodes and aired on Thursdays at 8:00 pm ET as part of the network's "Comedy Night Done Right" programming block.

Cast

Starring
Joel McHale as Jeff Winger
Gillian Jacobs as Britta Perry 
Danny Pudi as Abed Nadir
Yvette Nicole Brown as Shirley Bennett 
Alison Brie as Annie Edison 
Donald Glover as Troy Barnes 
Jim Rash as Dean Craig Pelton
Ken Jeong as Sgt. Ben Chang 
Chevy Chase as Pierce Hawthorne

Recurring
Richard Erdman as Leonard Briggs 
Erik Charles Nielsen as Garrett Lambert 
Dino Stamatopoulos as Alex "Star-Burns" Osbourne 
John Goodman as Vice Dean Robert Laybourne 
Danielle Kaplowitz as Vicki Jenkins 
Luke Youngblood as Magnitude 
Dan Bakkedahl as Murray the AC Repairman 
Charley Koontz as Neil 
J. P. Manoux as Faux-by/Dopple-deaner 
Mel Rodriguez as Sgt. Nunez 
Michael K. Williams as Biology Professor Marshall Kane 
Jerry Minor as Jerry the Janitor 
Eddie Pepitone as Crazy Schmidt 
David Neher as Todd Jacobson
Larry Cedar as Cornelius Hawthorne

Guest stars
Rob Corddry as Alan Connor ("Introduction to Finality")
Keith David as Narrator ("Pillows and Blankets")
Giancarlo Esposito as Gilbert Lawson ("Digital Estate Planning")
Kirk Fox as Blade, Britta's carnie ex-boyfriend ("Origins of Vampire Mythology")
Jeff Garlin as himself ("Documentary Filmmaking: Redux")
Luis Guzmán as himself ("Documentary Filmmaking: Redux")
Leslie Hendrix as Botanist ("Basic Lupine Urology"), a play on her role as a medical examiner in the Law & Order franchise the episode is styled upon
Michael Ironside as Colonel Archwood ("Basic Lupine Urology")
Taran Killam as Cory "Mr. Rad" Radison ("Regional Holiday Music")
D.J. "Shangela" Pierce as Miss Urbana Champaign ("Advanced Gay")
Travis Schuldt as Subway / Rick ("Digital Exploration of Interior Design")
Martin Starr as Professor Cligoris ("Geography of Global Conflict")
French Stewart as Vinnie, a former French Stewart look-alike ("Contemporary Impressionists")
Malcolm-Jamal Warner as Andre Bennett ("Urban Matrimony and the Sandwich Arts")

Episodes

Production
The series was renewed for a third season on March 17, 2011. Filming for the season began on July 25, 2011. Jim Rash, who portrays Dean Pelton, was promoted to a series regular after having a recurring role throughout the first two seasons. Michael K. Williams was cast as the study group's new biology professor, who is described as a deeply intense character. John Goodman appears in a multi-episode arc as Vice Dean Laybourne, the head of Greendale's air conditioning repair school, and is a foe for Dean Pelton. Martin Starr guest starred in the second episode of the season as a political science professor and project advisor when the study group take a Model UN class; with Starr possibly returning later in the season. Larry Cedar appeared in the sixth episode as Cornelius Hawthorne, the patriarch of the Hawthorne family and Pierce's father. In the same episode, Jerry Minor returned as the Greendale custodian who previously appeared in "English as a Second Language" and "For a Few Paintballs More". The season's Christmas-themed episode is a musical featuring all original music, with the storyline being the study group having to fill in for the school's glee club. The episode also features a guest appearance by Saturday Night Live cast member Taran Killam. Giancarlo Esposito appeared in "Digital Estate Planning" as Gilbert, a man who Pierce is surprised to learn was a longtime employee for his late, very racist father, and the study group needs to work with Gilbert and Pierce on an issue regarding Cornelius' Hawthorne's last will and testament. The character of Star-Burns is killed off in episode 17 of the season, as portrayer of the character Dino Stamatopoulos simply asked for it to happen. Stamatopoulos also serves as a consulting producer and writer for the series, so he wanted to focus on his main job, as he explained "I'm not an actor". Series creator Dan Harmon explained Star-Burns' death is "not just thrown away", but "triggers the rest of the entire season. Filming of the season concluded in mid-February 2012.

Dan Harmon planned on making the third season more cohesive than the previous, with more connectivity between the storylines of the episodes, as well as to make the show more grounded, with somewhat fewer themed episodes. Harmon also planned out the characters' storylines for the entire season. Explaining the theme of the third season, and Jeff's journey for the season, Harmon says, "Season 3 is about the price that you pay when you figure out that you love a group of people. That's it in a nutshell. It's about the high cost of valuing people other than yourself, and that's the path that Jeff has been on. The third chapter for him is going to be the toughest of all. When you love people, their pain is your pain. Nobody likes having to deal with hassles more than Jeff Winger, and nobody's going to have to deal with more this year."

On November 14, 2011, NBC announced that they were removing Community from their mid-season schedule to make room for 30 Rock, which returned to Thursday nights. On February 21, 2012, it was announced that the series would return on March 15, 2012.

Reception
On Rotten Tomatoes, the season has an approval rating of 92% with an average score of 8.3 out of 10 based on 24 reviews. The website's critical consensus reads, "The Greendale study group take some of their boldest swings – though not all connect – in this freewheeling third season that nevertheless continues Communitys streak as the gold standard for fiendishly clever television."

Home media
The third season was released on DVD in region 1 on August 14, 2012, in region 2 on September 2, 2013, and in region 4 on September 21, 2012.

Notes

References

External links
 

2011 American television seasons
2012 American television seasons
Community (TV series) seasons